Imeni Poliny Osipenko District is an administrative and municipal district (raion), one of the seventeen in Khabarovsk Krai, Russia. It is located in the center of the krai. Its administrative center is the rural locality  (a selo) of imeni Poliny Osipenko. Population:  The population of the administrative center accounts for 43.3% of the district's total population.

Geography
The district is mountainous. In the western part rise the Yam-Alin, Dusse-Alin, Etkil-Yankansky, Mevadzha and Koltoursky ranges; in the eastern part, parallel to the Amgun River, rise the Kivun, Omal, Omeldin and Chayatyn ranges. The Nimelen-Chukchagir Lowland is located in the central part of the district.

The main rivers of the district are the Amgun and its tributaries Nimelen, Nilan and Semi, as well as the Oldzhikan, Uda and Somnia (Сомня). The Amgun is navigable from the mouth to imeni Poliny Osipenko village. There are about four thousand lakes in the district. The largest are Chukchagir and Dzhevdokha.

References

Notes

Sources

Districts of Khabarovsk Krai